Olle Lycksell (born August 24, 1999) is a Swedish professional ice hockey forward currently playing for  the Philadelphia Flyers of the National Hockey League (NHL). Lycksell was drafted in the sixth round of the 2017 NHL Entry Draft, 168th overall, by the Flyers.

Playing career
Lycksell played as a youth within hometown club, IK Oskarshamn, making his professional debut in the HockeyAllsvenskan in the 2015–16 season, before moving to continue his development with top tier club, Linköping HC.

Lycksell continued his junior career with Linköping HC, making his full SHL debut during the 2017–18 season, appearing in 26 games for 5 goals and 7 points.

Following his sixth season within Linköping HC, having appeared in his first full SHL season in 2019–20, and collecting a career high 9 goals and 21 points in 51 games, Lycksell left the club out of contract and signed a two-year contract with Färjestad BK on 2 April 2020.

In his first season with Färjestad in 2020–21, Lycksell matched his previous season output in posting 9 goals and 21 points through 46 regular season games. He added 3 points in six post-season games. On 6 May 2021, he was signed by the Philadelphia Flyers to a two-year, entry-level contract.

Career statistics

References

External links
 

1999 births
Living people
Färjestad BK players
IK Oskarshamn players
Lehigh Valley Phantoms players
Linköping HC players
People from Oskarshamn Municipality
Philadelphia Flyers draft picks
Philadelphia Flyers players
Swedish ice hockey right wingers
Växjö Lakers players
Sportspeople from Kalmar County